Nashi or n'aschi is a northeastern wind that occurs in winter on the Iranian coast of the Persian Gulf, especially near the entrance to the gulf, and also on the Makran coast. It is probably associated with an outflow from the central Asiatic anticyclone, which extends over the high land of Iran. It is similar in character, but less severe than the bora.

External links

Winds